Bloody Roar 3 is a 2000 fighting arcade video game developed by Eighting and Hudson Soft. It is the first of the Bloody Roar series to appear on the Sony PlayStation 2.

Gameplay
The main feature of Bloody Roar 3 is the ability to transform into beasts, which is involved in all of the Bloody Roar games. Once the character transforms, they regain part of the health they have lost and become much stronger and more powerful than before.

Characters

Returning characters
Yugo the Wolf - W.O.C. leader determined to stop the XGC. 
Alice the Rabbit - a W.O.C. activist who follows Yugo on his search for the XGC mark's origin.
Long the Tiger - a vagrant on a journey to stop the harmful XGC.
Gado the Lion - a Commissioner willing to create coexistence between humanity and Zoanthropes.
Kenji/Bakuryu the Mole  - a student with the desire to protect his burdened brother, leading him to retake the Bakuryu mantle to redeem himself, and the moniker as well.
Uriko the Cat/Half-Beast - a student who goes to find the XGC to cure her boredom.
Stun the Insect - a solitary former researcher for Tylon turned a rogue “man-made zoanthrope” with unstable body, encouraged by Jenny to look for the XGC.
Shina the Leopard - a mercenary adopted daughter of Gado sent to find the source of the XGC. 
Jenny the Bat - a top spy tasked with looking into the chaos of the XGC.
Busuzima the Chameleon - a former head researcher for Tylon setting out to harness the power of the XGC code.
Shenlong the Tiger - Long’s clone who now lives completely different live as a bouncer who will kill anyone he does not like, in order to differentiate himself from Long.

New characters
Xion the Unborn - a cold and reserved man who plots to exterminate all other Zoanthropes. His Zoanthrope is the Unborn.
Kōryū - a relentless machine modeled after the first Bakuryu, Ryūzō Katō. His Zoanthrope is the Iron Mole. (Unlockable)
Uranus - a perfected clone of Uriko known as the strongest Zoanthrope. Her Zoanthrope is the Chimera. (Unlockable)

Audio
The music was composed by Takayuki Negishi and was recorded at MIT Studio with Jun Kajiwara at the guitar, Michio Nagaoka at the bass, Atsuo Okamoto at the drums and Negishi at the synthesizer. The Japanese voice cast includes Hideo Ishikawa as Yugo, Mika Kanai as Alice, Ryōtarō Okiayu as Long, Kazumi Tanaka as Busuzima, Junko Noda as Bakuryu, Marina Ōno as Uriko, Takeshi Aono as Koryu and Eriko Fujimaki as Uranus. The English voice cast features Barry Gjerde as Yugo and a system voice, Kimberly Forsythe as Alice, Dario Toda as Long, Lenne Hardt as Shina, Paul Lucas as Busuzima, Greg Dale as Stun, Samantha Vega as Jenny, Chris Wells as Gado, Bill Sullivan as Shenlong, Michael Naishtut as Bakuryu, Bianca Allen as Uriko and John Nuzzo as Xion.

Reception

The PlayStation 2 version received above-average reviews according to the review aggregation website Metacritic. Eric Bratcher of NextGen said of the Japanese import, "Hunting for the next king of the jungle in 3D fighters? You won't want to mount this one's head on your wall, but it'll keep you warm and well fed until your next big game hunt." In Japan, Famitsu gave it a score of 29 out of 40.

Also in Japan, Game Machine listed the arcade version in their February 15, 2001 issue as the fifth most-successful arcade game of the past year.

Notes

References

External links
 

2000 video games
Activision games
Arcade video games
Bloody Roar
Eighting games
Fighting games
Hudson Soft games
Multiplayer and single-player video games
PlayStation 2 games
Video game sequels
Video games developed in Japan
Video games scored by Takayuki Negishi
Virgin Interactive games